Rock of Ages 3: Make & Break is a tower defense racing video game developed by ACE Team and published by Modus Games. The game is the sequel to the 2011 Rock of Ages and the 2017 Rock of Ages 2: Bigger & Boulder. It was released on July 21, 2020 for Microsoft Windows, PlayStation 4, Xbox One, and Nintendo Switch; and on August 14, 2020, for Google Stadia.

Gameplay 

Players build boulders and roll them into enemy gates as fast as they can. Once they break through they want to squish everything. This seemingly simple task is made more difficult because both sides pepper each other's lanes with traps, obstacles, and defenses. Unlike the first two games in the series, the game lets players make different courses which are conquered during competition.

Development 
On August 15, 2019, a sequel to Rock of Ages was announced by ACE Team. Instead of Atlus, the company partnered with Giant Monkey Robot and Modus Games; they released the title in 2020.

Reception 

According to review aggregator Metacritic, the game received "mixed or average reviews" from critics.

GameSpot praised the game's course editor, trials, traversal, story, and tone while criticizing its frustrating gameplay, easy challenges, incomprehensible AI, and unfair casualty rate. Nintendo Life lauded the game's visual style, energetic cutscenes, soundtrack, and performance; they saw the subpar graphics and illegible UI text as negatives. 

Push Square deemed the gameplay, multiplayer, and story mode to be fun finding that the course editor, presentation, and community level menu needing to be improved.

References

External links 
 

2020 video games
PlayStation 4 games
Racing video games
Nintendo Switch games
Tower defense video games
Video games developed in Chile
Windows games
Xbox One games
Unreal Engine games
Multiplayer and single-player video games
Video game sequels
Stadia games
ACE Team games